The 2022 Canadian Soccer League season was the 25th season under the Canadian Soccer League name. The season began on May 29, 2022, and concluded with the CSL Championship on August 27, 2022, with FC Continentals defeating reigning champions Scarborough SC for their third championship title. The regular season title was secured by the Serbian White Eagles which marked their fifth league divisional title.

Summary

Regular season contenders 
The race for the regular season title was a highly competitive bout as the outcome was decided on the final match of the regular season. Four teams dominated the race and all had an opportunity to clinch the spot. The Serbian White Eagles laid claim to the title with only a single point separating them from the York Region Shooters.  

The previous time the Serbs won a divisional title was in the 2015 season. Former head coach Uroš Stamatović returned at the helm and assembled a competitive roster with a mixture of domestic and import players from Serbia. One notable domestic signing was former Canadian international Dejan Jakovic. After a four-year absence York Region returned to the fold and finished as runners-up. The Vaughan-based club primarily consisted of younger domestic players and remained competitive as they led the way for six weeks.  

Scarborough SC and FC Continentals were the final two major contenders with the eastern Toronto side finishing third with a two-point difference from the Serbs. The club renewed the contract of head coach Mirko Medić and continued Scarborough's undefeated streak which stemmed from the previous season to 17 matches. FC Continentals the re-branded name of FC Vorkuta occupied the fourth position with a three-point difference separating them from the champions. The war in Ukraine directly affected the daily operations and on-field performance of FC Continentals as it restricted the team's access to player recruitment and to properly organize and achieve sufficient results throughout the season.

Other teams 
The two remaining teams were BGH City FC and Toronto Falcons where both parties finished at the bottom half of the standings. Toronto an expansion side led by Willy Giummarra relied upon local talent along with former FC Vorkuta veterans to remain competitive in the league and managed a fifth-place finish. As the COVID-19 pandemic restrictions were still enforced both Brantford Galaxy and Hamilton City continued fielding their hybrid team that finished the season at the bottom of the standings.

Playoff champion  
The landscape of the playoff scene included all six member clubs. The Serbian White Eagles and York Region Shooters were both given a bye to the second round of the competition. In the preliminary stages of the postseason, FC Continentals automatically advanced as Toronto Falcons were disqualified as they failed to meet the requirements to compete in the playoffs. Scarborough also made the next round as they defeated BGH City.  

Both the Serbs and York Region were eliminated in the semifinals which set the stage for the third consecutive rematch between Continentals and Scarborough. The regular season champion was defeated by FC Continentals while Scarborough eliminated the Shooters in extra time. In the championship match, the Continentals defeated Scarborough for their third playoff title.

Changes from 2021 
The league returned to a five-month schedule. Two new entries were accepted into the league. The most notable returnee was the York Region Shooters which previously played until the 2017 season and was a charter member from the 1998 CNSL–OPSL merger. The other addition was the Toronto Falcons a club managed and organized by former FC Vorkuta general manager Samad Kadirov. A name change occurred with FC Vorkuta being renamed FC Continentals.

The league intended to launch the Enio Perruzza Memorial Trophy a separate competition in tribute to former league announcer Enio Perruzza who died the previous year. The Memorial Trophy was to be an open tournament featuring league members along with invitational clubs. The playoffs would commence in early August with the championship final being scheduled for August 27, 2022. The season would resume activity throughout September and October for the invitational Memorial Trophy but the tournament was rescheduled for the next season due to the lack of available stadiums.

Teams

Coaching changes

Standings

Playoffs

Quarterfinals

Semifinals

Finals

Season statistics

Goals

Updated: August 9, 2022

Hat-tricks

References  

2022
2022 domestic association football leagues
2022 in Canadian soccer